Joaquim Manuel Durão (25 October 1930 – 21 May 2015) was a Portuguese chess player. An International Master since 1975. Durão took part in The Gijon International Chess Tournaments (1955 and 1965). He was 13 times Portuguese champion, represented his country in ten Chess Olympiads, and was president of the Portuguese Chess Federation.

He remained active until 2015.

He was born in Lisbon.

Notable games
 Perez Perez vs. Durão 0-1, Beerwijk 1961 - the Portuguese master sacrifices his queen for a tempo

References

External links

 
 

1930 births
2015 deaths
Portuguese chess players
Chess International Masters
Chess Olympiad competitors
Chess officials
Sportspeople from Lisbon